Two types of language change can be characterized as linguistic drift: a unidirectional short-term and cyclic long-term drift.

Short-term unidirectional drift
According to Sapir, drift is the unconscious change in natural language. He gives the example Whom did you see? which is grammatically correct but is generally replaced by Who did you see? Structural symmetry seems to have brought about the change: all other wh- words are monomorphic (consisting of only one morpheme). The drift of speech changes dialects and, in long terms, it generates new languages. Although it may appear these changes have no direction, in general they do. For example, in the English language, there was the Great Vowel Shift, a chain shift of long vowels first described and accounted for in terms of drift by Jespersen (1860–1943). Another example of drift is the tendency in English to eliminate the -er comparative formative and to replace it with the more analytic more. Thus, in some dialects one now regularly hears more kind and more happy instead of the prescriptive kinder, happier. In English, it may be the competition of the -er agentive suffix which has brought about this drift, i.e. the eventual loss of the Germanic comparative system in favor of the newer system. Moreover, the structural asymmetry of the comparative formation may be a cause of this change.

The underlying cause of drift may be entropy: the amount of disorder (differences in probabilities) inherent in all linguistic systems.

Another underlying cause of drift may be crosslinguistic influence (CLI) in situations of language contact. For example, in Shanghai Chinese (Shanghainese) it has been reported that vowel sounds have gradually changed over time due to the influence of Mandarin Chinese (Yao & Chang, 2016). At a shorter timescale (weeks of intensive exposure to a second language) as well, phonetic changes have been observed in an individual's native language; these changes, termed 'phonetic drift', generally approximate properties of the second language.

Long-term cyclic drift
Cyclic drift is the mechanism of long-term evolution that changes the functional characteristics of a language over time, such as the reversible drifts from SOV word order to SVO and from synthetic inflection to analytic observable as typological parameters in the syntax of language families and of areal groupings of languages open to investigation over long periods of time. Drift in this sense is not language-specific but universal, a consensus achieved over two decades by universalists of the typological school as well as the generativist, notably by Greenberg (1960, 1963), Cowgill (1963), Wittmann (1969), Hodge (1970), Givón (1971), Lakoff (1972), Vennemann (1975) and Reighard (1978).

To the extent that a language is vocabulary cast into the mould of a particular syntax and that the basic structure of the sentence is held together by functional items, with the lexical items filling in the blanks, syntactic change is no doubt what modifies most deeply the physiognomy of a particular language. Syntactic change affects grammar in its morphological and syntactic aspects and is seen as gradual, the product of chain reactions and subject to cyclic drift.

See also
Phonological change
Phonemic differentiation
Sound change
Syntactic change

Notes

References
Chang, Charles B. (2012). Rapid and multifaceted effects of second-language learning on first-language speech production, Journal of Phonetics, 40.249-68. 
Chang, Charles B. (2013). A novelty effect in phonetic drift of the native language, Journal of Phonetics, 41.520-33. 
Chang, Charles B. (2019a). Language change and linguistic inquiry in a world of multicompetence: Sustained phonetic drift and its implications for behavioral linguistic research, Journal of Phonetics, 74.96-113. 
Chang, Charles B. (2019b). Phonetic drift. The Oxford handbook of language attrition, Monika S. Schmid and Barbara Köpke (eds.), 191-203. Oxford, UK: Oxford University Press. 
Cowgill, Warren (1963). A search for universals in Indo-European diachronic morphology. Universals of language, Joseph H. Greenberg (ed.), 114-141 (2nd ed., 1966). Cambridge, Massachusetts: MIT Press.
GivÓn, Talmy (1971). Historical syntax and synchronic morphology: an archaeologist's field trip. Papers from the Regional Meetings of the Chicago Linguistic Societv 7.394-415.
Greenberg, Joseph H. 1960. A quantitative approach to the morphological typology of language, International Journal of American Linguistics, 26.178-94 (Reprint of a 1954 article).
Greenberg, Joseph H. 1963. Some universals of grammar with particular reference to the order of meaningful elements. Universals of language, Joseph H. Greenberg (ed.), 73-113 (2nd ed., 1966). Cambridge, Massachusetts: MIT Press.
Hale, Mark. 2007, Historical linguistics: Theory and method, Oxford, Blackwell
Hodge, Carleton T. 1970. The linguistic cycle. Language Sciences. 13.1-7.
Jespersen, Otto (1909–1949). A Modern English grammar on historical principles. London: Allen & Unwin. Chapter 7.
Martinet, André (1955). Économie des changements linguistiques: traité de phonétique diachronique. Berne: Frannke.
Reighard, John. 1978. Contraintes sur le changement syntaxique. Cahiers de linguistique de l'Université du Québec 8.407-36.
Sapir, Edward (1921). Language: An introduction to the study of speech. New York: Harcourt.
Vennemann, Theo (1975). An explanation of drift. Word order and word order changes, Charles N. Li (ed.), 269-305.
Wittmann, Henri (1969). "The Indo-European drift and the position of Hittite." International Journal of American Linguistics 35.266-68;
Wittmann, Henri (1983). "Les réactions en chaîne en morphologie diachronique." Actes du Colloque de la Société internationale de linguistique fonctionnelle 10.285-92.
Yao, Yao, and Chang, Charles B. (2016). On the cognitive basis of contact-induced sound change: Vowel merger reversal in Shanghainese, Language, 92.433-67. 
Zipf, George Kingsley (1935). The psycho-biology of language. Cambridge, Massachusetts: MIT Press.
Zipf, George Kingsley (1949). Human behavior and the principle of least effort. Cambridge, Massachusetts: MIT Press.

Historical linguistics